David Morgan (born 1 January 1994) is an Australian swimmer. He competed in the men's 200 metre butterfly and the  medley events at the 2016 Summer Olympics, winning bronze in the latter.

References

External links
 
 

1994 births
Australian male freestyle swimmers
Commonwealth Games medallists in swimming
Commonwealth Games silver medallists for Australia
Living people
Medalists at the 2016 Summer Olympics
Medalists at the FINA World Swimming Championships (25 m)
Olympic bronze medalists for Australia
Olympic bronze medalists in swimming
Olympic swimmers of Australia
Sportspeople from Cardiff
Sportspeople from the Gold Coast, Queensland
Swimmers at the 2016 Summer Olympics
Swimmers at the 2018 Commonwealth Games
World Aquatics Championships medalists in swimming
Australian male butterfly swimmers
Swimmers at the 2020 Summer Olympics
21st-century Australian people
Medallists at the 2018 Commonwealth Games